Ames is an unincorporated community in the Renault Precinct of Monroe County, Illinois, United States.

History
Ames was first called Yankeetown, on account of there being a large share of Yankees among the original settlers. A post office called Ames was established in 1881, and remained in operation until 1907.

References

Unincorporated communities in Monroe County, Illinois
Unincorporated communities in Illinois
Metro East